David Michael James Brudenell-Bruce, Earl of Cardigan (born 12 November 1952), is the heir apparent to the marquessate of Ailesbury, and its subsidiary titles. These include Earl of Cardigan, which he currently uses as his courtesy title.

Biography

Early life
David Brudenell-Bruce is the son of Michael Brudenell-Bruce, 8th Marquess of Ailesbury, and Edwina Sylvia de Winton Wills of W.D. & H.O. Wills. He has two sisters, a half-brother, and four half-sisters. His parents divorced when he was six years old. He attended Hawtreys prep-school, Eton College, Rannoch School, and the Royal Agricultural College, Cirencester.

Career
He has been Secretary of Marlborough Conservatives since 1985, and has been a member of the Executive of the Devizes Constituency Conservative Association since 1988.

Since 1987, he has been the 31st Hereditary Warden of Savernake Forest, a privately owned forest in England. The Savernake Estate has never been sold in almost 1000 years, and the family are descended from the Seymour family, with Jane Seymour being the 3rd wife of King Henry VIII, and the only wife to bear the King a son, King Edward VI.  In 2005, his family trust granted a commercial lease to a US-based hotel corporation to turn his ancestral home, Tottenham House, into a 5-star luxury golf resort. The American company failed to pay its rent in the recession, and ceased trading.  The Earl was then in dispute with the Trustees of Savernake Estate over their management and disposal of its assets. In July 2011, it was reported that the estate was in severe financial difficulties. In August 2011, the Earl was involved in a dispute with the Savernake estate's trustees over his plans to sell some of the family silver, and again in March 2012 over their plans to sell some of the family paintings, when he was represented by Henry Hendron. He was later sued by Hendron over his fee. In 2014 the Earl took court proceedings against the trustees, claiming that they had paid themselves excessive remuneration. The High Court agreed, concluding that the trustees had failed in part of their duties, and that Mr Moore had paid himself remuneration to which he was not entitled; Mr Moore was ordered to reimburse over £100,000 and the trustees were made to pay £64,225 to the trust as compensation for loss of rent. In separate 2014 proceedings, the Court of Appeal upheld the trustees' decision to sell Tottenham House to an unnamed buyer for £11.25m. By 2013 the earl's financial affairs at his Trustees' hands had suffered to the extent that he was claiming Jobseeker's Allowance whilst training to be a HGV lorry driver. In 2017 he was able to remove both trustees from office, and restore his family income.

Battle of the Beanfield
The Earl of Cardigan witnessed the Battle of the Beanfield, a notorious incident in 1985 in which Wiltshire Police were accused of brutalising a convoy of travellers on land near Stonehenge, making over 300 arrests, said to be the biggest arrest of civilians in the United Kingdom in 100 years. Largely as a result of his testimony, police charges against members of the convoy were rejected in the Crown Court. In relation to this several national newspapers criticised him and questioned his suitability as a witness. He successfully sued these papers for claiming that he made false statements and that he was providing accommodation for the New Age Travellers. Lord Cardigan later said:

I hadn't realised that anybody that appeared to be supporting elements that stood against the establishment would be savaged by establishment newspapers. Now one thinks about it, nothing could be more natural. I hadn't realised that I would be considered a class traitor. If I see a policeman repeatedly truncheoning a very pregnant woman over the head from behind (as I did) I do feel I'm entitled to say "that's a terrible thing you're doing, Officer". I went along, saw a dreadful episode in British Police history, and simply reported what I saw.

Personal life
By his first marriage to Rosamond Winkley (died 2012), he had his first two children, Thomas James Brudenell-Bruce, Viscount Savernake (born 1982), and Lady Catherine Anna Brudenell-Bruce (born 1984).

After his divorce, he married in 2011 Catherine Joanne Powell, of Flagstaff, Arizona, now Countess of Cardigan. In October 2013 his wife gave birth to a daughter, Lady Sophie Jane Brudenell-Bruce.

References

thePeerage.com
‘CARDIGAN, Earl of’, Who's Who 2008, A & C Black, 2008; online edn, Oxford University Press, Dec 2007

Courtesy earls
Alumni of the Royal Agricultural University
1952 births
Living people
People educated at Hawtreys
People educated at Rannoch School
People educated at Eton College
David